Athericidae is a small family of flies known as water snipe flies or ibis flies. They used to be placed in the family Rhagionidae, but were removed by Stuckenberg in 1973. They are now known to be more closely related to Tabanidae. Species of Athericidae are found worldwide.

Ecology
The adults mostly feed on nectar but some species feed on mammal blood. Hematophagy has been demonstrated in adult Suragina and Suraginella and is suspected in other genera. Larvae do not feed in the first instar; after first molting, they become predatory. Larvae typically prey on invertebrates or are saprophagous.

The larvae have distinctive morphology. Their head capsule is well developed dorsally, and they have long abdominal prolegs with crocheted hooks. These structures help the larvae move without being washed away in their preferred larval habitat, fast-flowing montane streams and torrents. The larvae are predators of other aquatic invertebrates such as caddisflies. Adults have stout, tapered abdomens, slightly elongated legs, with aristate antennae. Males are sexually dimorphic with holoptic eyes.

Adult athericids usually rest on the upper surface of leaves, near the streams from which they emerge, or more inland if they are looking for a blood meal. Athericids commonly stroke or palpate the surface of leaves, an action they share with the Tabanidae. All species deposit their eggs at one time and then die.

Subfamilies and genera
Two subfamilies are described; the Dasyommatinae contain only Dasyomma and all other extant genera are in the Athericinae.

Dasyommatinae
Dasyomma Macquart, 1840
Athericinae
Asuragina Yang & Nagatomi, 1992
Atherix Meigen, 1803
Atrichops Verrall, 1909 
Microphora Krober, 1840
Pachybates Bezzi, 1926
Suragina Walker, 1858
Suraginella Stuckenberg, 2000
Trichacantha Stuckenberg, 1955
Xeritha Stuckenberg, 1966
Athericites Mostovski, Jarzembowski & Coram, 2003
Succinatherix Stuckenberg, 1974 Baltic amber, Eocene

References

 https://www.researchgate.net/publication/233727146_60_Diptera_Athericidae
 http://www.waterbugkey.vcsu.edu/php/familydetail.php?idnum=7&show=1508&fa=Athericidae&o=Diptera&ls=larvae
 http://www.periodico.ebras.bio.br/ojs/index.php/ebras/article/view/25/44 
 http://bugguide.net/node/view/12756

External links
 Catalogue of Life
 Biolib

 
Brachycera families
Taxa named by Brian Roy Stuckenberg